The 2019 Ghana Movie Awards was an event held at National Theatre on December 20, 2019. At the event, Actress Salma Mumin made history as she won her first best actress in the lead role award category. Actor Alphonse Menyo also took home his first trophy for best actor in role category. The annual award recognises excellence in the Ghana's movie industry and this was its ninth edition.

The most nominations going to 'Gold coast lounge', 'Away bus', 'A.B.A.D' and most wins awarded to 'Gold coast lounge' movie and its cast.

Awards

Categories 

 ACHIEVEMENT IN CINEMATOGRAPHY
 GOLD COAST LOUNGE BY ISREAL DE-LIKE
 AWAY BUS BY KELLY DOE
 A.B.A.D(FEATS OF DESTINY) BY BERNARD BENSON & DAVID OKAFOR
 GETTING MARRIED BY WILLIAM SEFA NTIAMOAH
 BUSINESS AS USUAL BY TOYIN ODEKOYA

 ACHIEVEMENT IN COSTUMES AND WARDROBE
 GOLD COAST LOUNGE BY VIVIAN ADJETEY
 A.B.A.D (FEATS OF DESTINY) BY GORDON GALOLO
 GETTING MARRIED BY SAMIRA YAKUBU & FAUZIA YAKUBU
 AWAY BUS BY VENESSA NANA & AMA ODOOM

 ACHIEVEMENT IN DIRECTING
 GOLD COAST LOUNGE BY PASCAL AKA ISREAL DE-LIKE
 A.B.A.D (FEATS OF DESTINY) BY ISAAC AGYAPONG
 GETTING MARRIED BY FRANK RAJAH ABASE
 AWAY BUS BY PETER SEDUFIA and KOFI ASAMOAH
 BUSINESS AS USUAL BY PASCAL AMANFO

 ACHIEVEMENT IN EDITING (NOMINEES)
 AWAY BUS BY AFRA MARLEY & PETER SEDUFIA
 A.B.A.D (FEATS OF DESTINY) BY SOLOMON TAMAKLOEN and YAKO PRINCE OSEI
 GOLD COAST LOUNGE BY KWEKU KACOU
 SIN CITY BY KOBI OKYERE
 GETTING MARRIED BY NICHOLAS AGBEKO

 ACHIEVEMENT IN MAKEUP AND HAIRSTYLING
 GETTING MARRIED BY MARIAM MUSAH
 GOLD COAST LOUNGE BY FLORENCE OWOO
 A.B.A.D (FEATS OF DESTINY) BY FREMPONG TAKYI BEA & PATIENCE MENSAH
 AWAY BUS BY RHODA-LINE ANSONG & ANN MARIE DZADEY

 ACHIEVEMENT IN MUSIC WRITTEN FOR A MOVIE (ORIGINAL SCORE)
 GOLD COAST LOUNGE BY PASCAL AKA
 A.B.A.D (FEATS OF DESTINY) BY GEORGE SEDZRO
 GETTING MARRIED BY BERNI ANTI
 BUSINESS AS USUAL BY KOBI OKYERE JR
 AWAY BUS BY AFRA MARLEY

 ACHIEVEMENT IN MUSIC WRITTEN FOR A MOVIE (ORIGINAL SONG)
 GOLD COAST LOUNGE

MUSIC BY PASCAL AKA ISREAL DE-LIKE

LYRIC BY REQUEL AMMAH
 GETTING MARRIED

MUSIC AND LYRICS BY BERNI ANTI
 AWAY BUS

MUSIC BY ENOCH BLEBOO

LYRICS BY SOLOMON OTOO
 40 LOOKS GOOD ON YOU

MUSIC AND LYRICS BY STEPHENIE BENSON

 ACHIEVEMENT IN PRODUCTION DESIGN
 GOLD COAST LOUNGE

PRODUCTION DESIGN BY JULIUS ELIKEM

SET DECORATION BY PROP HAVEN
 A.B.A.D (FEATS OF DESTINY)

PRODUCTION DESIGN BY GORDON GALOLO

SET DECORATION BY ROBERT AYIM
 AWAY BUS

PRODUCTION DESIGN BY JAMES AVAALA

SET DECORATION BY HORLA MANUVOR

 ACHIEVEMENT IN VISUAL EFFECTS
 A.B.A.D (FEATS OF DESTINY) BY BRA CUOJO & JERRY DEBBAH
 GOLD COAST LOUNGE BY PASCAL AKA
 AWAY BUS BY PETER KOJO SAMPAH

 ACHIEVEMENT IN WRITING ADAPTED OR ORIGINAL SCREEN PLAY
 GOLD COAST LOUNGE

SCREEN PLAY BY PASCAL AKA
 SAVE THE STREET

SCREEN PLAY BY FRANKQUOPHY AWUKU HANYABUI
 40 LOOKS GOOD ON YOU

SCREEN PLAY BY FOLAKE AMANFO
 BUSINESS AS USUAL

SCREEN PLAY BY SOLAKE AMANFO & RANDOLPH OBAH
 AWAY BUS

SCREEN PLAY BY KOFI ASAMOAH, YAW TWUMASI AND PETER SEDUFIA

 BEST ACTOR AFRICAN COLLABORATION
 MIKE EZURUONYE IN TENDER LIES
 JIDOLA DABO IN BUSINESS AS USUAL
 KUNLE RENI IN SIN CITY
 ALENNE MANGET IN BROKEN
 FRANK ARTUS IN SHUKI

 BEST ACTRESS AFRICAN COLLABORATION
 SYNDY EMADE IN BROKEN
 ROSE MEURER IN SIN CITY
 UCHE JOMBO IN 40 LOOKS GOOD ON YOU
 RUTH KADIRI EZERAKA IN TENDER LIES

 BEST MOTION PICTURE OF THE YEAR
 GOLD COAST LOUNGE

PRODUCER - ESI YEBOAH
 A.B.A.D (FEATS OF DESTINY)

PRODUCER- ISAAC AGYAPONG
 GETTING MARRIED

PRODUCERS- ABDUL SALAM MUMUNI AND TONY RAMESH LACHMA
 BUSINESS AS USUAL

PRODUCER- PASCAL AMANFO & SELASSIE IBRAHIM
 40 LOOKS GOOD ON YOU

PRODUCER- SELASSIE IBRAHIM
 AWAY BUS

PRODUCERS- KOFI ASAMOAH AND PETER SEDUFIA
 SIN CITY

PRODUCER- YVONNE NELSON
 ADOMA

SALLAM MUMUNI

 BEST MOVIE AFRICAN COLLABORATION
 BROKEN BY SYNDY EMADE
 TENDER LIES BY RUTH KADIRI
 40 LOOKS GOOD ON YOU BY SELASSIE IBRAHIM

 BEST SHORT MOVIE
 NIRVANA BY WILLIAM KOJO AGBETI
 ADA BY JAMES NARTEY
 ELECTION BY JOHN AGBEKO

 DISCOVERY OF THE YEAR
 RAQUEL AMMAH IN GOLD COAST LOUNGE
 CINA SOUL IN GOLD COAST LOUNGE
 OPHELIA DOEFIA IN SAVE THE STREET
 FLORENCE ADJEI IN ADOMA
 ROSY MEURER IN SIN CITY
 Qwasi Blay Jnr. IN ADOMA

 FAVORITE ACTOR
 VAN VICKER
 MAJID MICHEL
 JOHN DUMELO
 PRINCE DAVID OSEI
 JAMES GARDINER
 KWADWO NKANSAH (LIL WIN)
 KOFI ADU (AGYA KOO)
 RICHARD ASHANTI (KALYBOS)
 JUSTICE HYMS (GHANA JESUS)
 AKWASI BOADI (AKROBETO)
 KWAKU MANU
 BENSON NANAYAW ODURO BOATENG (FUNNY FACE)

 FAVORITE ACTRESS
 JOSELYN DUMAS
 NANA AMA MACBROWN
 JACKIE APPIAH
 YVONNE NELSON
 YVONNE OKORO
 FELA MAKAFUI
 LYDIA FORSON
 JULIET IBRAHIM
 NADIA BUARI
 EMELIA BROBBEY
 MOESHA BODUONG
 MAAME SERWAA

 PERFORMANCE BY AN ACTOR IN A SUPPORTING ROLE
 JEFFERY NORTEY IN ADOMA
 UMAR KRUPP IN AWAY BUS
 ADJETEY ANNAG IN GOLD COAST LOUNGE
 KOFI ADU IN AWAY BUS
 PRINCE DAVID OSEI IN A.B.A.D (FEATS OF DESTINY)

 PERFORMANCE BY AN ACTOR IN A LEADING ROLE
 ALPHONSE MENYO IN GOLD COAST LOUNGE
 KOFI ADJORLOLO IN A.B.A.D (FEATS OF DESTINY)
 JAMES GARDINER IN BUSINESS AS USUAL
 MIKKI OSEI BERKO IN AWAY BUS
 Qwasi Blay Jnr. IN ADOMA

 PERFORMANCE BY AN ACTRESS IN A SUPPORTING ROLE
 JESSICA WILLIAMS IN A.B.A.D (FEATS OF DESTINY)
 FELLA MAKAFUI IN AWAY BUS
 KALSOUME SINARE IN GETTING MARRIED
 FLORENCE ADJEI IN ADOMA
 ZYNNELL ZUH IN GOLD COAST LOUNGE

 PERFORMANCE BY AN ACTRESS IN THE LEADING ROLE
 RAQUEL AMMA IN GOLD COAST LOUNGE
 NADIA BUARI, JACKIE APPIAH, LYDIA FORSON, CHRISTABEL EKEH IN GETTING MARRIED
 YVONNE NELSON IN SIN CITY
 SALMA MUMIN IN AWAY BUS
 SELASSIE IBRAHIM, UCHE JOMBO, ROSELYN NGISSAH, STEPHENIE BENSON, SHASSY BELLO IN 40 LOOKS GOOD ON YOU

References 

Ghana Movie Awards
Ghana
2019 in Ghana